The Women's heptathlon competition at the 1998 European Championships in Budapest, Hungary was held on Friday August 21 and Saturday August 22, 1998. The event was one of the permit meetings of the inaugural 1998 IAAF World Combined Events Challenge.

Medalists

Schedule

August 21

August 22

Records

Results

See also
 1997 Women's World Championships Heptathlon
 1998 Hypo-Meeting
 1999 Women's World Championships Heptathlon

References
 todor66
 Results

Heptathlon
Combined events at the European Athletics Championships
1998 in women's athletics